Qantab is a village in Muscat, in northeastern Oman.

The Qantab beach located here is a popular tourist destination.

The Jewel of Muscat, a replica of a ninth century merchant sailing vessel (dhow), was built at the traditional ship-building yard at Qantab.

References

Populated places in the Muscat Governorate